Ágnes Simon (born September 23, 1974 in Cluj-Napoca, Romania) is a cross-country skier competing for Hungary. She competed for Hungary at the 2014 Winter Olympics in the 10 kilometre classical race, finishing in 69th place out of 76 competitors.

Simon originally competed for her native Romania but made the switch to competing for Hungary in 2005.

References

External links
 
 
 
 
 
 

1974 births
Living people
Hungarian female cross-country skiers
Olympic cross-country skiers of Hungary
Cross-country skiers at the 2014 Winter Olympics
Sportspeople from Cluj-Napoca
Hungarian people of Romanian descent